Samuel Trotman may refer to:
 Samuel Trotman (1650–1720), Member of Parliament for Bath (UK Parliament constituency)
 Samuel Trotman (1686–1748), Member of Parliament for Woodstock (UK Parliament constituency)